A Feast in Time of Plague is an 1830 play by Aleksandr Pushkin. The plot concerns a banquet in which the central figure taunts death with a toast "And so, O Plague, we hail thy reign!". The story is based on 4th scene of Act 1 of John Wilson's play "The City of Plague" (1816).

The play was written in 1830 and published in 1832 as one of four Little Tragedies (Malenkie tragedii) together with The Stone Guest (Kamenny gost'); Mozart and Salieri (Motsart i Salyeri) and The Miserly Knight (Skupoy rytsar). All four of these plays were set as one act operas by Russian composers; Dargomyzhsky, Rimsky-Korsakov, Rachmaninov, and for the Feast, César Cui.

References

1830 plays
Plays by Aleksandr Pushkin
Plays adapted into operas